The un-sprung cart was a simple, sturdy, one-horse, two-wheeled vehicle used by roadmen, farmers and the like for small loads of relatively dense material like road metal or dung. In Australia and New Zealand, it is frequently called a dray. Elsewhere, that is a name occasionally used. The name dray is also used for a wagon.

A sprung cart, by contrast was a light, one-horse (or often, pony), two-wheeled vehicle with road springs, for the carriage of passengers on informal occasions. It was a class of vehicles with the name varying according to the body mounted on it.

See also 
 Types of carriages

References
Oxford English Dictionary (Cart 2a and 3)

Carts